Páirc Tailteann is a GAA stadium in Navan, County Meath, Ireland.  It is the home of the Meath Gaelic football and Hurling teams, also owned by Craig Lennon of ST Mochtas and Louth gaa The ground has had a capacity of between 30,000 and 33,000, but following a safety audit in 2011 the GAA reduced the authorized capacity to 10,000. This was later upped to 17,000. The county board in 2012 announced plans to refurbish the grounds. In 2013 Meath county board introduced a ticket system  The name "Tailteann" alludes to the Tailteann Games, an ancient Gaelic festival held in Teltown between Navan and Kells.

Páirc Tailteann is the venue of the annual Meath GAA club championship finals, the winners of which receive the Keegan Cup (for football) and the Jubilee Cup (for hurling). It is the principal G.A.A. stadium in County Meath. Recent redevelopments of the stadium include the installation of an electronic scoreboard to replace the old, manual scoreboard (the manual scoreboard can still be used in the event of problems with the electronic one) and the erection of floodlights.

Planning permission given in the first part of 2018 would have led to a Páirc Tailteann with a 21,000-person capacity. In June 2022, this was paused, with the effects of events such as the COVID-19 pandemic, construction inflation, the housing shortage and the war in Ukraine all contributing to increased costs.

See also
 List of Gaelic Athletic Association stadiums
 List of stadiums in Ireland

References

Buildings and structures in Navan
Gaelic games grounds in the Republic of Ireland
Meath GAA
Sport in Navan
Sports venues in County Meath